Smart TV is a Bosnian local cable television channel based in Tešanj, Bosnia and Herzegovina. The program is mainly produced in Bosnian language.

External links 
 Communications Regulatory Agency of Bosnia and Herzegovina

Mass media in Tešanj
Television stations in Bosnia and Herzegovina